Dasyloricaria latiura is a species of armored catfish native to Panama and Colombia where it is found in the Tuira and Atrato River basins.  This species grows to a length of  SL.

References
 

Dasyloricaria
Freshwater fish of Colombia
Fish of Panama
Fish described in 1912